The 1998–99 season was the 84th season of the Isthmian League, which is an English football competition featuring semi-professional and amateur clubs from London, East and South East England. The league consisted of four divisions.

Premier Division

The Premier Division consisted of 22 clubs, including 18 clubs from the previous season and four new clubs:
 Aldershot Town, promoted as champions of Division One
 Billericay Town, promoted as runners-up in Division One
 Hampton, promoted as third in Division One
 Slough Town, demoted from the Football Conference

Sutton United won the division and were promoted to the Football Conference. Bishop's Stortford and Bromley finished bottom of the table and relegated to Division One, while Carshalton Athletic were reprieved after Wealdstone, finished third in Division One, were refused promotion due to ground grading.

At the end of the season Hampton changed name into Hampton & Richmond Borough.

League table

Division One

Division One consisted of 22 clubs, including 16 clubs from the previous season and six new clubs:

Two clubs relegated from the Premier Division:
 Hitchin Town
 Oxford City
 Yeading

Three clubs promoted from Division Two:
 Braintree Town
 Canvey Island
 Wealdstone

Canvey Island won the division to get a second consecutive promotion. Hitchin Town finished second and returned to the Premier Division at the first attempt, while Wealdtone, finished third, were refused promotion due to ground grading. Molesey, Wembley and Berkhamsted Town relegated to Division Two.

League table

Division Two

Division Two consisted of 22 clubs, including 16 clubs from the previous season and six new clubs:

Three clubs relegated from Division One:
 Abingdon Town
 Thame United
 Wokingham Town

Three clubs promoted from Division Three:
 Harlow Town
 Hemel Hempstead
 Hertford Town

Bedford Town won the division and were promoted to Division One along with Harlow Town, who achieved a second consecutive promotion and Thame United, who returned to Division One after the relegation. Hertford Town relegated back to Division Three along with Bracknell Town and Abingdon Town, who get a second consecutive relegation.

League table

Division Three

Division Three consisted of 20 clubs, including 17 clubs from the previous season and three new clubs:

Three clubs relegated from Division Two:
 Cheshunt
 Egham Town
 Tilbury

Ford United won the division and were promoted along with Wingate & Finchley and Cheshunt, who returned straight after the relegation from Division Two.

League table

Cup Competitions
The results from the finals of the league's three cup competitions:

Ryman League Cup: The league's premier cup competition, with clubs from all four divisions competing.

Aldershot Town 2–1 Boreham Wood (played at Southampton F.C.)

Puma Full Members Cup: Featuring teams from the top two divisions.

Hendon 1-0 Worthing (played at Sutton United)

Vandanel Trophy: Featuring teams from the bottom two divisions.

Leighton Town 1-0 Windsor & Eton (played at Chesham United)

See also
Isthmian League
1998–99 Northern Premier League
1998–99 Southern Football League

References

The Official Football Association Non League Club Directory 2000 

Isthmian League seasons
6